The One-Two-Two was one of the most luxurious and illustrious brothels of Paris in the 1930s and 1940s. The name was taken from the address, 122 Rue de Provence, 8th arrondissement of Paris. The numbers were translated into English to ensure that foreign tourists would be able to find the brothel and as a password for French people.

Opened in 1924, the "One-Two-Two" closed its doors in 1946 when the Marthe Richard law prohibited brothels in France. The building is now used for business and law offices.

Origins of One-Two-Two 
The One-Two-Two was opened in 1924 by Marcel Jamet and his first wife Fernande, who called herself Doriane. She had formerly worked in another brothel in Paris, Le Chabanais. Doriane, through her husband, acquired 122 Rue de Provence. Initially she only employed three women.

Originally, the building had three floors and was the former private mansion of Prince Joachim Murat. A fourth floor was added by Marcel Jamet in 1933. It was later increased to seven imposing floors. There were white shutters which were always closed.

Doriane left the One-Two-Two to marry a rich diplomat in 1939. She was replaced by Georgette Pélagie, known as Fabienne, a young woman who became sub-mistress at the age of 21 years. Marcel Jamet married her in 1942 and hosted an extraordinary feast for the 56 distinguished guests, who consumed 34 magnums of champagne and 176 bottles.

Fabienne went on to write a book about the One-Two-Two in 1975.

Operation 
The building had twenty-two decorated rooms. Forty to sixty-five prostitutes worked for 300 clients per day. It was open from 4:00 pm to 4:00 am and the sub-mistresses filtered the men at the entrance. The girls of the establishment had to have four sex-sessions a day at twenty francs each, excluding tips, and two sessions on Sundays. There was also a bar, a refectory for the girls, and a doctor's office

There was also a restaurant, the Boeuf à la Ficelle ("beef with the string," named after a recipe of roast beef filet dipped in a broth of vegetables and spices on the end of a string). The waitresses wore only high-heeled shoes and a camellia in their hair. Guests were welcome for dinner and coffee and to smoke a cigar in a living room afterwards. They could chat with girls without the obligation to go further.

The One-Two-Two during the German Occupation 
During World War II and the German occupation of Paris (1940–1944), the One-Two-Two, like other luxury brothels such as Le Chabanais, was a place of "after-work" relaxation for many German officers who came to benefit from the services of the young boarders.

The establishment wasn't affected by rationing. Otto Brandl, one of the main officers of the Abwehr in France after September 1940, was involved the Parisian black market. He and captain Wilhelm Radecke ran their black market operations from the One-Two-Two.

Also involved were "Monsieur Michel" (Mandel Szkolnikoff), the biggest supplier of the Germans, and "Joseph" (Joseph Joanovici), a former Romanian-born scavenger who has the status of "economically valuable Jew", members of the French Gestapo (nicknamed "Carlingue"  or Fuselage in French) and members of Pierre Bonny and Henri Lafont criminal gang.

After the Liberation of Paris by the allies, Fabienne traded with the Americans. She wrote that there were very good people, but also racists. She didn't accept that one guy wanted to hit a girl because she was black.

Patrons 
It was a place frequented by high society; where people went to be seen there (some men going there only for dining with their companion) and to enjoy the charm of its "boarders."
 The maharadjah of Kapurthala and his entourage, including a prince of Afghanistan.
The Aga Khan, Leopold III of Belgium, Randolph Churchill.
 The swindler Alexandre Stavisky.
Tino Rossi, Sacha Guitry, Jean Gabin, Raimu, Cary Grant, Humphrey Bogart and Katharine Hepburn, Mae West, Mistinguett, Edith Piaf, Suzy Solidor, Martine Carol.

"The journey around the world" 
Each room had its own women, highlighted on pedestals, with fitting outfits and lighting. The rooms were decorated like théatrical scenes of many periods and countries of the world. Some guests practiced "the journey around the world", which consisted in adopting positions inspired by the Kama Sutra, in the rooms of different countries, thereby making a world tour of erotic pleasures.

The main rooms were:
 The transatlantic steamer cabin, with sea view, porthole, deck chair.
 The pirate room, which included a four-poster bed that would mechanically swing like a boat in a tempest whilst jets of water, hidden in the walls, would drench the occupants for the ultimate experience in leaky boat sex.
 The Orient Express room, an exact replica of a cabin in the famous train. This included the shaking and bouncing effect of being on a train and included a railway soundtrack. As an option, you could demand an intrusive conductor to enter in the room, and join in the festivities.
 The hay loft, with real straw.
 The igloo room.
 The tipi of the Indians of America.
 The Provençal room.
 The country room.
 The Egyptian chamber in the style of Cleopatra.
 The Roman chamber with the orgy ambience of triclinium.
 The Greek chamber with antique columns.
 The Renaissance room with the courtesans of King Francis I of France.
 The mirrored gallery, like a small version of the Palace of Versailles with huge swiveling mirrors.

The rooms on the upper floors were devoted to BDSM pleasures. As Fabienne Jamet said:  "The closer one got to the sky, the closer one got to Hell.":
 The torture chamber of the Middle Ages, with shackles, chains and whips.
 The torture room with crucifixion staging, where handcuffs replace the nails to tie the victim to the cross.

Notes

See also

Bibliography 
 Fabienne Jamet, One Two Two – 122 rue de Provence, Olivier Orban, 1975.
 http://www.aubonheurdujour.net/Decors_de_Bordels.html Entre Intimité et Exubérance, Paris-Province 1860–1946, Ed. Nicole Canet, 2011

Filmography 
 One, Two, Two : 122, rue de Provence'' is a 1978 French film directed by Christian Gion. The film chronicles the eventful daily life of the establishment.

Other articles 
 Prostitution in France
 Parisian Brothels
 Le Chabanais
 La Fleur blanche

External links 
  - Includes interior photographs
 
 

Brothels in Paris
History of Paris
Buildings and structures in the 8th arrondissement of Paris
Hôtels particuliers in Paris
1924 establishments in France
1946 disestablishments in France
Joachim Murat